Kentucky Route 213 (KY 213) is a  state highway in the U.S. state of Kentucky. The highway connects mostly rural areas of Estill, Powell, and Montgomery counties with Stanton and Jeffersonville.

Route description

Estill County
KY 213 begins at an intersection with KY 52 (Tipton Road) east-northeast of Ravenna, in the Daniel Boone National Forest, within Estill County. It travels to the north-northeast and eventually travels along the Powell County line. It then curves to the east-northeast and intersects KY 1057 (Hardwicks Creek Road) on the northern edge of the forest. The two highways travel concurrently to the east-southeast and enter Estill County proper. They enter Furnace, where they split. KY 213 heads to the north-northeast and enters Powell County proper.

Powell County
At Knowlton Ridge Road, KY 213 curves to the southwest and leaves the national forest. It curves to the west-northwest and enters Knowlton. There, the highway curves to the north-northwest and enters Stanton. It intersects the western terminus of KY 3528 (Pendleton Street). Immediately afterward, it has an interchange with the Bert T. Combs Mountain Parkway. Immediately after that is an intersection with the southern terminus of KY 2483 (Stanton Road). Three blocks later, it meets KY 11/KY 15 (College Avenue). The road curves to the north-northeast and intersects the southern terminus of KY 2487 (Boone Street). At Court Street is the eastern terminus of KY 2476. One block later, the highway intersects the eastern terminus of KY 2026 (Maple Street). KY 213 curves back to the north-northwest and crosses over the Red River. It intersects KY 615 (North Bend Road). They begin a concurrency. Immediately, they cross over Boone Branch. Then, they split. Since KY 615 is a circular route, the two highways meet again in Morris. KY 213 curves to the northwest and enters Montgomery County.

Montgomery County
KY 213 curves back to the northeast and intersects the western terminus of KY 1314 (Calk Lake Road). It immediately crosses over Upper Spruce Creek. The highway continues winding its way to the north. It intersects the southern terminus of KY 646 (Willoughby Town Road). It enters Jeffersonville, where it has a brief concurrency with U.S. Route 460 (US 460; Main Street). KY 213 resumes its northeastern direction and passes the Jeffersonville Community Center. It crosses over Slate Creek and curves to the north-northeast before leaving Jeffersonville. The highway curves to the east-southeast and crosses over Pretty Run. Then, it curves back to the north-northeast and meets its northern terminus, an intersection with KY 713 (Spencer Road).

Major intersections

See also

References

0213
Transportation in Estill County, Kentucky
Transportation in Powell County, Kentucky
Transportation in Montgomery County, Kentucky